David W. Sanford (born David Weissbord; February 10, 1957) is an American civil rights attorney. He is the chairman and co-founder of Sanford Heisler Sharp and is based in New York City. He works primarily on gender and race discrimination class action and individual cases, as well as wage and hour overtime cases and False Claims Act matters. He is the lawyer who brought gender discrimination actions against Greenberg Traurig and Howrey, which folded in 2011. He has earned a reputation for representing women suing BigLaw firms over pay equity and gender discrimination. Sanford has recovered more than one billion dollars for individual clients and the United States government since 2004.

Education 
Sanford received his JD from Stanford Law School at the age of 35, in 1995. He completed his master's degree and an ABD from the University of North Carolina at Chapel Hill and his bachelor's degree from Vassar College in 1980.

Career 
Sanford did not start his career as an attorney. He was an assistant professor in the Philosophy Department at Williams College, and also taught at the University of North Carolina at Chapel Hill and Oberlin. After law school, David Sanford did a clerkship for Senior United States District Judge of the United States District Court for the District of Columbia. After clerking, he joined the law firm of David Boies and then moved to another law firm, Jones, Day Reavis & Pogue. Finally, in 2004, he co-founded his own civil rights litigation firm with Jeremy Heisler in Washington, DC.

Notable cases 
Velez v. Novartis

Filed against pharmaceutical giant Novartis, for gender discrimination on behalf of its female sales representatives. The jury awarded $253 million in damages and forced the company to introduce sweeping human resources reforms costing some $22.5 million and opened the door to future gender bias suits. The case later settled for $175 million.

Enrichetta Ravina Vs. Geert Bekaert, Columbia Business School

Sanford represented former Columbia Business School faculty member Enrichetta Ravina in a retaliation and gender case against her mentor Professor Geert Bekaert and Columbia University, who were both found liable for retaliation, winning the plaintiff $1.25 million in damages.

Campbell et al. v. Chadbourne & Parke LLP, et al., SDNY

The case was brought by Chadbourne partner Kerrie Campbell in August 2016 alleging systemic pay discrimination against female partners. In October 2016, the case was expanded by adding other named plaintiffs, additional defendants, and increasing the damages demand. After two years of litigation which established that partners in law firms are employees for purposes of Title VII, the parties reached a settlement in March 2018. This litigation was in the headlines of mainstream and legal press from filing to settlement and changed the conversation about compensation, promotion, and career opportunities for female partners in BigLaw.

Cracker Barrel

David Sanford was the lead counsel in a race discrimination class action suit against Cracker Barrel restaurants. The case concerned discrimination in pay and promotion, and also involved discrimination against African-American customers. The United States Department of Justice intervened in the case after five years of litigation and the suit settled for $8.7 million.

Schaefer v General Electric

Lorene Schaefer, the former general counsel of GE Transportation, sued GE in May 2017 in the U.S. District Court for the District of Connecticut alleging that a “very male-dominated culture” at GE systemically discriminated against women executives at all levels, denying them equal pay and promotion. The suit had sought $500 million in damages on behalf of 1,500 female employees. In 2009, the case was settled on confidential terms.

Recognition 
Sanford was inaugurated into the National Law Journal’s Elite Trial Lawyers Hall of Fame in 2015. He has been repeatedly acknowledged by Law360 as an ‘Employment Lawyer MVP’ and ‘Titan of the Plaintiffs’ Bar’. Sanford was a finalist for the 2018 Attorney of the Year by the American Lawyer and was named a Leader in the Field for 2017-18 by Chambers and Partners. He has also received AV-rating by Martindale-Hubbell and was named a Best Lawyer in America for 2019 by Best Lawyers.

References 

1957 births
Living people
American civil rights lawyers
University of North Carolina at Chapel Hill alumni
Vassar College alumni
Stanford Law School alumni